Somewhere City is the debut studio album by American emo band Origami Angel. It was released by Chatterbot Records on November 15, 2019. The lyrics describe a town called "Somewhere City" the lead singer, Ryland Heagy likes to go when he feels sad. Vinyl pressings of the album also feature a map of the fictional somewhere city.

Reception 
Writing for Pitchfork, Ian Cohen liked the album stating how everything they had released before this had felt meaningless and unserious with this album giving them a newfound purpose. He stated that Somewhere City is an invigorating album to listen to for half an hour. Leor Galil for Chicago Reader complimented the album's energy, saying "Heagy and Doherty use their instrumental skills to work flamboyant, sometimes playful parts into neat, hook-filled songs, lending emotional resonance to what might otherwise seem like merely athletic displays."

Track listing

Personnel 

 Ryland Heagy - Guitar, Bass, Vocals
 Pat Doherty - Drums
 Jake Checkoway - engineer, mixing, mastering

References 

2019 debut albums
Emo albums by American artists
Math rock albums by American artists